Mahbubabad (also Romanized as Maḩbūbābād and Mahboob Abad; also known as Maḩbūbābāb and Makh-Baba) is a village in Mishab-e Shomali Rural District, in the Central District of Marand County, East Azerbaijan Province, Iran. At the 2006 census, its population was 1,266, in 327 families.

References 

Populated places in Marand County